A general election was held in the U.S. state of Florida on November 6, 2018. All of Florida's executive officers were up for election as well as Florida's Class I Senate seat and all 27 seats in the United States House of Representatives. Primary elections were on August 28, 2018. The Republicans took control of the U.S. Senate seat held by three-term Democrat Bill Nelson in an upset while the Democrats picked up two House seats as well as the office of the Commissioner of Agriculture. The Republican gains in the state despite the trend towards Democrats nationwide began a transition of Florida from a swing state to a red state.

United States Senate

Senator Bill Nelson (D) ran for a fourth term against Governor Rick Scott (R). The race ended up being the most expensive Senate race in U.S. history. Nelson was narrowly defeated by then-Governor Rick Scott.

Nelson was the only statewide Democrat to carry Monroe County.

United States House of Representatives
Florida elects 27 U.S. Representatives from its congressional districts. Democrat Donna Shalala defeated Maria Elvira Salazar to succeed retiring Republican congresswoman Ileana Ros-Lehtinen in the 27th District and Debbie Mucarsel-Powell defeated incumbent Republican congressman Carlos Curbelo in the 26th District. This changed Florida's congressional delegation from a 16–11 Republican majority to a narrow 14–13 majority.

Results of the 2018 United States House of Representatives elections in Florida by district:

Governor

Then-incumbent Republican Governor Rick Scott (since 2011) was term-limited and prohibited from seeking a third consecutive term. Democratic Mayor of Tallahassee Andrew Gillum ran against Republican former U.S. Representative Ron DeSantis. DeSantis narrowly defeated Gillum.

Attorney General

Incumbent Republican Florida Attorney General Pam Bondi (since 2011) was term-limited and prohibited from seeking a third consecutive term. Ashley Moody, former judge for the Thirteenth Judicial Circuit of Florida, defeated state representative Frank White to win the Republican nomination. Sean Shaw, a state representative, defeated attorney Ryan Torrens to win the Democratic nomination. Moody defeated Shaw by approximately 6 percentage points, by winning her home county, Hillsborough, giving her the largest margin for a Republican candidate for the 2018 elections.

Chief Financial Officer

Incumbent Republican Chief Financial Officer of Florida Jimmy Patronis was appointed to the office in June 2017 and sought a full term in 2018. Patronis successfully won a full term and defeated former state senator Jeremy Ring by approximately 3 percentage points.

Commission of Agriculture

Incumbent Republican Florida Commissioner of Agriculture Adam Putnam (since 2011) was term-limited and prohibited from seeking a third consecutive term. State representative Matt Caldwell ran against lobbyist attorney Nikki Fried. Fried became the only statewide elected Democrat from Florida following the 2018 election.

State Legislature
20 out of 40 seats in the Florida Senate and all 120 seats of the Florida House of Representatives were up for election. The balance of political power before the election for each chamber was:

Senate

House of Representatives

The balance of political power after the election was:

Senate

House of Representatives

Constitutional Amendments
Florida voters voted on 12 constitutional amendments. An amendment requires sixty percent to pass. Amendment 8 was removed from the ballot before the elections.

References

External links
Candidates at Vote Smart 
Candidates at Ballotpedia
Campaign finance at OpenSecrets

 
Florida